Activate is the fourth studio album by Back Door, released in 1976 by Warner Bros. Records. It was produced by Carl Palmer, known for his drumming in the bands Atomic Rooster and ELP. Original member Tony Hicks had left the band before recording the album and had been replaced by Adrian Tilbrook on drums. After the release of Activate, the band played less and less together, and eventually broke up around 1977.

Track listing

Personnel
Adapted from the Activate liner notes.

Back Door
 Ron Aspery –  alto saxophone, baritone saxophone, soprano saxophone, acoustic piano, electric piano, Mellotron, organ, arrangements
 Colin Hodgkinson – bass guitar, fretless bass guitar, electric guitar, twelve-string guitar, vocals, arrangements
 Adrian Tilbrook – drums

Production and additional personnel
 Andy Hendriksen – engineering
 Mustard – cover art
 Carl Palmer – production

Release history

References

External links 
 

1976 albums
Back Door (jazz trio) albums
Warner Records albums
Albums produced by Carl Palmer